Víctor Cecilio Moreno Sevilla (born July 15, 1985 in Cojedes) is a Venezuelan former road racing cyclist.

Major results
Source:

2006
 1st  Time trial, National Under-23 Road Championships
 1st Stage 4a Vuelta al Estado Portugesa
 Vuelta Ciclista Aragua
1st Stages 4 & 6
2007
 1st  Time trial, National Road Championships
 1st Stage 12 Vuelta a Venezuela
 1st Mountains classification Volta de Ciclismo Internacional do Estado de São Paulo
 3rd Clasico Aniversario de la Federacion Venezolana de Ciclismo
 6th Time trial, Pan American Road and Track Championships
2008
 1st Virgen de la Candelaria
 1st Clasico Ciudad de Valencia
 1st Stage 1 Vuelta al Oriente
 1st Stage 4 Vuelta Internacional al Estado Trujillo
 2nd Time trial, National Road Championships
 2nd Overall Vuelta al Estado Zulia
2009
 1st Clásico San Francisco de Asís
 3rd Time trial, National Road Championships
2012
 2nd Virgen de la Candelaria
2013
 Vuelta a Venezuela
1st  Mountains classification
1st  Sprints classification
1st Stage 4
 1st Stage 2 Vuelta a Paria
2014
 7th Road race, Central American and Caribbean Games
2015
 6th Overall Volta Ciclística Internacional do Rio Grande do Sul

References

External links

 

1985 births
Living people
Venezuelan male cyclists
Vuelta a Venezuela stage winners
People from Cojedes (state)
Competitors at the 2014 Central American and Caribbean Games